Hard is a national music festival, music cruise and concert brand founded in 2007.  The event line-ups consist of alternative and electronic acts and emerging talents. The first Hard Music Festival was held on December 31, 2007 in Downtown Los Angeles and featured Justice, Peaches and 2 Live Crew. Hard is best known for the Hard Summer Music Festival and Hard Haunted Mansion, though also runs several smaller events and one-off shows. Hard is sometimes called "Hardfest" by fans, based on the event's website and social media shortcuts. Additional Hard brands include the Hard Summer, Hard Red Rocks, Hard at Electric Daisy Carnival, and the Holy Ship! electronic music cruise, and former events include Hard Day of The Dead, Hard 13, Turkey Soup and Hard Miami. Live Nation Entertainment acquired Hard in 2012.

Hard Summer Music Festival
Since 2008, Hard has run an annual Hard Summer Music Festival. The first was held on July 19, 2008 in Downtown Los Angeles at the Shrine Exposition Hall.  In 2009, Hard Summer changed venues to The Forum. The Inglewood police department and fire marshals were forced to shut the event because it was declared a "hazard" by the fire department. In 2010, the venue changes to again to the Los Angeles State Historic Park, where it continued to be held until 2014, when it moved to the Whittier Narrows Recreation Area in El Monte, California. In 2015 Hard Summer once again switched venues to the Fairplex in Pomona, California.

In 2016, Hard Summer moved to the  Fontana Auto Club Speedway and hosted around 146,000 people. For its 10th anniversary in 2017, the festival was set to return to the Auto Club Speedway; however, after a notable decline in ticket sales, LiveNation moved the event to Glen Helen Amphitheater in San Bernardino, California. About 80,000 people attended the two day weekend. Hard Summer 2018 returned to the Auto Club Speedway in August 2018, where it remained in 2019.

In 2020, Hard Summer was cancelled due to the COVID-19 pandemic. The festival resumed in 2021, and moved location to the NOS Event Center in San Bernardino, where it remained in 2022. In 2023, Insomniac stated that the event would be held at the Los Angeles Memorial Coliseum, Exposition Park, and BMO Stadium, making it the first time since 2010 that a major Insomniac event was hosted in Los Angeles.

Hard Red Rocks
In March 2013, Hard Events announced that it would be hosting a new event in Colorado called Hard Red Rocks at the Red Rocks Amphitheatre. The event took place on August first of that year, and has returned to that event annually. Hard Red Rocks 2018 is set to take place on August second feature guests including DJ Snake, Virtual Self, Mija, GG MAGREE, and Hekler.

National and International Tours

2007 Hard New Year's Eve Music Festival

2010 Hard Summer Tour

August 2010 marked the launch of the Hard Summer Tour, as promoter Gary Richards decided to take the party on the road; 12 dates scattered across the United States and Canada; Incorporating hip-hop into the fold.

2011
Trent Reznor helped organise the event, seeking out the help of out Gary Richards from Hard to do so, stating: "I’ve always respected what [Richards] does with Hard, and I thought that was exactly what we needed."

2012 Hard presents Boys Noize Live

2014 Hard Straylia

See also
List of electronic music festivals

References

External links
 
 
 About Hard 

Electronic music festivals in the United States
Live Nation Entertainment
Concert tours
Music festivals established in 2007